Roy Andrew Michael Godfrey (born 11 August 1989) is a South African rugby union player, currently playing in England with Championship side Jersey Reds. His regular position is loosehead prop.

Career

Youth and Varsity Rugby

After playing high school rugby for Selborne College in his hometown of East London, Godfrey moved to Durban to join the  Academy, representing the  side during the 2010 Under-21 Provincial Championship competition.

The Madibaz finished fifth in 2012 Varsity Cup, with Godfrey playing in all seven their matches during the season, scoring two tries. He also played for them in 2013 and 2014. Not only did he once again start their matches during both these seasons, but he was also named captain of the side. He weighed in with four tries during those two seasons to help the Madibaz achieve their best results in the Varsity Cup, reaching the semi-final for the first time in 2013 and repeating the feat in 2014.

SWD Eagles

Godfrey's Varsity Cup exploits didn't go unnoticed at provincial level and he was signed by George-based outfit  for the 2013 Currie Cup First Division season. He was a regular in the side throughout the campaign, starting in all their matches during the season and occasionally captaining the side in the absence of regular skipped Kabamba Floors.

Perpignan

After the conclusion of the 2014 Currie Cup First Division season, Godfrey signed for French Rugby Pro D2 side  as a short-term replacement for Sona Taumalolo.

Wimbledon

He joined English National League 3 London & SE side Wimbledon RFC prior the 2015–16 season.

Jersey Reds
On 27 April 2017, Godfrey signed for RFU Championship club Jersey Reds prior to the 2017-18 season.

References

1989 births
Living people
Jersey Reds players
Rugby union players from East London, Eastern Cape
Rugby union props
South African rugby union players
SWD Eagles players
USA Perpignan players
South African expatriate sportspeople in Jersey
South African expatriate sportspeople in England
South African expatriate sportspeople in France
South African expatriate rugby union players
Expatriate rugby union players in France
Expatriate rugby union players in England
Expatriate rugby union players in Jersey